Dolynskyi Raion may stand for:

 Dolyna Raion — a former raion (district) of Ivano-Frankivsk Oblast
 Dolynska Raion — a former raion (district) of Kirovohrad Oblast